Early Recordings is an album by the blues musician Lightnin' Hopkins featuring tracks recorded at Gold Star Recording Studios between 1946 and 1950, eight of which were originally released as 10-inch 78rpm records on the Gold Star and Jax labels, along with eight others that were previously unissued. Arhoolie reissued The Gold Star Sessions on two CDs through Smithsonian Folkways in 1990.

Reception

AllMusic reviewer Eugene Chadbourne stated: "Much of the body of this blues artist's song catalog kind of runs together into a long odyssey, delivered in a rubato medium feel, sometimes locking into a steady beat but often hovering somewhere behind and ahead. As if performing an endless series of card tricks with only three cards, he comes up with variation after variation on the basic 12-bar form and a series of blues riffs that he has ready to fit any and all occasions. Listeners may not be able to tell one track from the next, but Hopkins' feel on guitar and charismatic, lilting voice has proven to be a winner with blues fans decade after decade. The ever adventuresome Hopkins cut some tracks on organ during this period ...  Although the resulting 'Organ Boogie' certainly provides some variety, the songs with the guitar are of much more lasting music value, the organ numbers mostly of interest as an oddity".

Track listing
All compositions by Sam "Lightnin'" Hopkins
 "Bluebird Blues" aka "Glory Be Blues" – 3:11 previously unreleased
 "Walking Blues" – 2:47
 "Unkind Blues" – 3:00
 "Mad With You" – 2:32
 "Somebody's Got to Go"  "Goodbye Blues" – 2:43 previously unreleased
 "Automobile Blues" – 2:47
 "Seems Funny Baby" – 3:03 previously unreleased
 "Coolin' Board Blues" a.k.a. "Thunder and Lightnin' Blues" – 2:43 previously unreleased
 "Airplane Blues" – 2:42
 "Loretta Blues" – 2:45 previously unreleased
 "Whiskey Blues" – 2:42 previously unreleased
 "You Don't Know" – 2:43
 "Organ Boogie" – 2:59 previously unreleased
 "What Can It Be" – 2:39
 "Ida Mae" – 2:40
 "Goin' Back and Talk to Mama" – 2:56 previously unreleased

Personnel
Lightnin' Hopkins – guitar, vocals, organ

References

Lightnin' Hopkins albums
1965 albums
Arhoolie Records albums